The Amsterdam Sloughs Wildlife Area is a  tract of protected land located in Burnett County, Wisconsin, managed by the Wisconsin Department of Natural Resources (WDNR). The Amsterdam Sloughs Wildlife Area is one of three such wildlife areas within the bounds of the Glacial Lake Grantsburg project, the others being Crex Meadows and Fish Lake.

Barrens and wetlands
Over half of the Amsterdam Sloughs Wildlife Area is covered by either barrens or wetlands, with this type of land cover being the main reason for conservation efforts in the general area.

Flora and fauna
There are several different types of trees residing in the wildlife area, the most prominent being oak, maple, hemlock, and red pine. In addition to the varied flora, in both Swan Lake and the surrounding marshland, musky, Northern pike, largemouth bass, walleye and northern pike are commonly found. Besides sea-dwelling fauna, black tern, turkey and shorebirds have been known to frequent the area.

Blomberg Lake and woods

The Blomberg Lake and Woods State Natural Area is a  state natural area located within the Amsterdam Sloughs Wildlife Area. The natural area includes Blomberg Lake, a  bog lake, with the other  being made up mainly of rich forested land.

References

External links
 U.S. Geological Survey Map at the U.S. Geological Survey Map Website. Retrieved March 25, 2022.
 1980 Amsterdam Sloughs Master Plan at the WDNR Website. Retrieved April 12, 2022.

State Wildlife Area
Protected areas of Wisconsin
Geography of Burnett County, Wisconsin
Protected areas established in 1956